Jinjiang District is one of 11 urban districts of the prefecture-level city of Chengdu, the capital of Sichuan Province, Southwest China. It is bordered by Longquanyi District to the east, Shuangliu County to the south, Wuhou District to the west, Qingyang District to the northwest, and Chenghua District to the north.

Geography
Sixteen subdistricts:

Duyuanjie 督院街街道, Yanshikou 盐市口街道, Chunxilu 春熙路街道, Shuyuanjie 书院街街道, Hejiangting 合江亭街道, Shuijingfang 水井坊街道, Niushikou 牛市口街道, Longzhoulu 龙舟路街道, Shuangguilu 双桂路街道, Lianxin 莲新街道, Shahe 沙河街道, Dongguang 东光街道, Shizishan 狮子山街道, Chenglonglu 成龙路街道, Liujiang 柳江街道, Sansheng 三圣街道

Economy
The head office of the fast food chain Dicos is on the 10th Floor, Building A of the Baichuan Building in Jinjiang District.

China Resources Beverage, the distributor of C'estbon water, has its southwest regional office on the 7th floor of the A section of the MCC Building in the district.

All Nippon Airways operates its Chengdu Office in the district, in Tower 2 of Plaza Central. It opened on June 7, 2011.

Education

Chengdu International School is located in the district.

References

External links

Official website of Jinjiang District Government  

Districts of Chengdu